Hülgerahu is a small, uninhabited, moraine-based Baltic Sea island belonging to the country of Estonia.

Hülgerahu covers approximately 0.15 hectares and lies just off the eastern coast of the larger island Kõverlaid.

The island belongs to both Hiiumaa Islets Landscape Reserve and The Laidelaht Wilderness Area and is closed to the public. Its beaches are an important breeding ground for birds and marine mammals such as grey seals.

References

External links
Map of Hiiumaa Islets Nature Reserve 
Hiiumaa Islets Nature Reserve

Estonian islands in the Baltic
Hiiumaa Parish
Uninhabited islands of Estonia